An anchor is a device that attaches to the sea bottom to prevent a boat from drifting.

Anchor may also refer to:

Devices
 Sea anchor, a device to slow the drift of a vessel without use of the seabed
 Earth anchor, a device to support structures, used in geotechnical and construction applications
 Anchor bolt, to attach objects or structures to concrete
 Anchor (climbing), used in rock climbing
 Anchor plate, to strengthen buildings
 Anchor, part of a microdermal implant in body modification
 Anchor escapement, a type of escapement used in pendulum clocks
 Screw anchor, to secure a screw in a brittle material
 Boat anchor (metaphor), a colloquial term for outdated equipment
 Digital anchor, uses GPS and electronic compass to hold a boat's position

Places
 Anchor, Illinois, US
 Anchor, Kentucky, US
 Anchor, Shropshire, a village in England
 Anchor, Texas, US

Arts, entertainment, and media

Music
 Anchor (Autumn Hill album), 2015
 Anchor (Colton Dixon album), 2014
 Anchor (EP), by Birds of Tokyo, 2015
 "Anchor" (Birds of Tokyo song), 2015
 Anchor (Trespassers William album), 1999
 "Anchor" (Cave In song), 2003
 Anchors (Will Hoge album), 2017
 Anchors, a 2013 album by I Am Empire
 "Anchor", a song by Lifehouse from Stanley Climbfall, 2002
 "Anchor", a song by Crossfade from Falling Away, 2006
 "Anchor", a song by Skillet from Victorious, 2019

Film 
 Anchor (film), a South Korean film

Other arts, entertainment, and media
 Anchor, a hammerhead shark character in Finding Nemo
 The Anchor (newspaper), a newspaper for the Rhode Island College campus
 Anchor Bible Series
 Anchor Monument (Matveev Kurgan), Russia
 Anchor, an electronic captions system that BBC Television used in the 1970s and 1980s
 News anchor, also known as a news presenter
 Plot anchor, a type of story-line plot device

Brands and enterprises
 Anchor (brand), New Zealand dairy products
 Anchor (housing association), housing and care provider for older people, UK
 Anchor (New Haven bar), a bar and restaurant in downtown New Haven
 Anchor Bankside, a pub in London
 Anchor Books, an imprint of Random House
 Anchor Brewing Company and Anchor Distilling Co., an American alcoholic beverage producer
 Anchor Electricals Pvt. Ltd., an Indian electrical device manufacturing subsidiary of Panasonic
 Anchor Hocking, glass company
 Anchor Inc., a video game developer
 Anchor Inn, Birmingham, England
 Anchor Records, a record label
 Anchor Stone Blocks, a brand of German stone blocks

Other uses
 Anchor baby, a term for a child born in the US to illegal immigrants or other non-citizens
 Anchor leg, the final runner in a track relay race
 Anchor store, a main tenant in a shopping mall
 Anchor telephone exchange, an underground telephone exchange in England
 HTML anchor, the source and destination of a web hyperlink, specified by the <a> HTML element
 Reserve currency, or anchor currency

See also
 Anchorage (disambiguation)
 Anchoring (cognitive bias), in psychology, sticking to a given reference point